James Allen Estes (born October 2, 1945) is an American ecologist and Distinguished Professor at University of California, Santa Cruz (UCSC), known for his studies of sea otters and kelp forest ecology. Born in Sacramento, California, he graduated from the University of Minnesota in 1967, earned a master's degree in Biology from Washington State University in 1969, and a Ph.D. in biology and statistics from the University of Arizona in 1974. He worked for the U.S. Fish and Wildlife Service and the U.S. Geological Survey from 1974 to 2007 before joining the UCSC faculty. He is a wildlife ecologist known for his work on ecosystem effect of large predators on ecosystems.  He co-edited the books The Community Ecology of Sea Otters (1988), Whales, Whaling, and Ocean Ecosystems (2007), and Trophic Cascades: Predators, Prey, and the Changing Dynamics of Nature (2010), and is the author of Serendipity: An Ecologist's Quest to Understand Nature (2016). He was elected to the National Academy of Sciences in 2014. Estes and his work are featured prominently in the 2018 documentary film The Serengeti Rules.

References

External links
Research page

1945 births
Living people
University of California, Santa Cruz faculty
University of Minnesota alumni
Washington State University alumni
University of Arizona alumni
American ecologists
Members of the United States National Academy of Sciences
People from Sacramento, California
United States Geological Survey personnel